The Martin Parelius Fourplex is a building in southeast Portland, Oregon listed on the National Register of Historic Places.

Further reading

See also
 National Register of Historic Places listings in Southeast Portland, Oregon

References

1911 establishments in Oregon
Buckman, Portland, Oregon
Bungalow architecture in Oregon
Colonial Revival architecture in Oregon
Houses completed in 1911
Portland Eastside MPS
Apartment buildings on the National Register of Historic Places in Portland, Oregon
Portland Historic Landmarks